Bellinger River, an open and trained mature wave dominated, barrier estuary, is located in the Mid North Coast region of New South Wales, Australia.

Course and features

Bellinger River rises below Point Lookout within the Great Dividing Range, southeast of Ebor, and flows in a meandering course generally east, joined by four tributaries including Never Never River, before reaching its mouth at the Tasman Sea of the South Pacific Ocean, east of Urunga. The river descends  over its  course.

Parts of the Bellinger River are contained within the Bellinger River National Park and the New England National Park. Other land uses in the valley include livestock grazing and forestry.

Waterfall Way is located adjacent to the middle reaches of the Bellinger River; and towards its mouth, the river is transversed by the Pacific Highway, near Raleigh.

A rare Australian turtle, the Emydura macquarii (or the Bellinger River freshwater turtle), has a restricted distribution in the upper Bellinger River above Thora.

History
Clement Hodgkinson was the first European to explore the area in March 1841.

See also

 Rivers of New South Wales
 List of rivers of Australia

References

External links

 

 

Rivers of New South Wales
Mid North Coast